KDE System Guard, also known as KSysGuard, is the task manager and performance monitor for the KDE platform on Unix-like systems. It can monitor both local and remote hosts, accomplished via running ksysguardd on the remote host, and having the GUI (ksysguard) connect to the remote instance. It can retrieve simple values or complex data such as tables and display this information in a variety of graphical displays. Displays can then be organized in work sheets. It also provides a detailed top-like process table.

KDE System Guard is a rewrite of the KDE 1.x task manager, KTop.

See also 

 top (software) - a task manager program found in many Unix-like operating systems
 htop - interactive system-monitor for Linux

References

External links
 KDE System Guard user wiki
 KDE System Guard Handbook

Free software programmed in C++
KDE Software Compilation
Linux process- and task-management-related software